This article contains a list of Lycian place names that have survived from ancient Lycia in Anatolia. Names of settlements and geomorphic features are known from ancient literary sources. Ptolemy's Geography lists places in Asia Minor and specifically Lycia.  Strabo's Geography has a section on Lycia as well, as does Pliny's Natural History. Stephanus of Byzantium includes a large number of Lycian places in Ethnica. Hierocles in Synecdemus lists the cities in the eparchy of Lycia. William Martin Leake's Journal of his own trips through Anatolia, as well as of those of many other travellers, with analyses of sources, mainly Ptolemy, is still a valuable source of information on the locations and appearances of the Lycian sites. In addition, numerous inscriptions in the Lycian language state some place names in their Lycian forms. The topographical information comes from the Aydin thesis, and was developed from Turkish military maps.

This article does not address the task of defining Lycia. Over a thousand or more years, the borders of the historical territory, called Lycia in English, are not likely to have remained invariant. This list includes places named by some source at some time as "Lycian", and also any settlement with a Lycian language name, even though located in some other city-state. "Lycia" therefore represents a maximum territory, to which any historical Lycia was never exactly identical.

Aydin studied 44 out of 78 known ancient settlements. Many more archaeological sites are not identifiable with ancient settlements. Aydin also collected information on 870 Turkish settlements over the same region. The moderns, certainly, populate the region much more densely than the ancients.

Some of the modern place names are given in Turkish. For the most part, the equivalent English, French or German pronunciations are good approximations, but Turkish has some letters not present in those languages. Ğ or ğ is not pronounced, but lengthens the preceding vowel. For example, dağ, "mountain", is pronounced daa. Substitution of an English G or g is false. Ç or ç is a ch as in child, Ş or ş is an sh as in shore. What appear to be an English C or c is a J as in John, while the J or j is pronounced as the z in azure. The vowels have a short rather than a long pronunciation. As Turkish is an agglutinative language, the endings do not have the same meanings; e.g., daği is not the plural of dağ, which is daĝlar (daalar).

: Top 0–9 A B C D E F G H I J K L M N O P Q R S T U V W X Y Z <noinclude>

A

B

C

D

E

G

H

I

L

M

N

O

P

R

S

T

X

Notes

References

External links
 

Lycian